Kondoa kondorum is a species of small, air-breathing land snails, terrestrial pulmonate gastropod mollusks in the family Zonitidae. This species is endemic to Micronesia.

References

Fauna of Micronesia
Kondoa (gastropod)
Taxonomy articles created by Polbot